Ngara is a commercial and residential suburb in the city of Nairobi.

Location
It is divided into Ngara East and Ngara West. Murang'a Road divides the two. It is located south of Parklands; west of Pangani; north of Kariokor.

Overview
In the early 20th century, Ngara and the southern parts of Parklands were the formal settlement for the Asian community that came to British East Africa to assist in the railway construction. However, Ngara especially Ngara East, has changed over the years and it's become ethnically diverse, with affordable housing for the low-middle to low-income earners, especially students.

Ngara has transformed into a high-density suburb with a number of high-rise flats coming up as well the national and city government launching affordable housing in the area. Ngara Civil Servant Housing, Ngara Housing Project, as well as the neighbouring suburb's Pangani Housing Project. The government is demolishing low-rise structures and replacing with the taller structures that can hold more housing units, an effort to curb the housing deficit in the city.

Points of interest
 The Kenya Institute of Curriculum Development (KICD), along Desai Road, off Murang'a Road. 
 The National Museums of Kenya, a state corporation that manages museums, sites and monuments in Kenya, along Kipande Road.
 The Ngara Girls' High School, a boarding secondary education institution.

References

Populated places in Kenya
Suburbs of Nairobi